Amealco de Bonfil Municipality is a municipality in Querétaro of central Mexico.

References

Municipalities of Querétaro